Mykhailo Markovych Dobkin (born 26 January 1970) is a Ukrainian politician, former governor of Kharkiv Oblast, former mayor of Kharkiv, and a former deputy of the Ukrainian parliament.

Early life and career 
Mykhailo Dobkin was born to a Jewish father and Ukrainian mother in Kharkiv. He graduated from the National University of Internal Affairs with a degree in law and the National University of Kharkiv, majoring in international economics.

From 1993 until 2002, Dobkin was an entrepreneur and director of several businesses. In his 2015 tax declaration, Dobkin stated that he owned 12 luxury cars.

People's Deputy of Ukraine (2002-2006) 
In the 2002 Ukrainian parliamentary election, Dobkin was elected as People's Deputy of Ukraine. Dobkin changed his political party several times while serving as a People's Deputy, going from For United Ukraine! to the  group less than a year after his election. Two years later, Dobkin again switched his party to the Social Democratic Party of Ukraine (united), and the year afterwards joined the Party of Regions, where he remained until the Verkhovna Rada was dissolved for the 2006 Ukrainian parliamentary election. From late 2005, Dobkin was a member of the political council of the Party of Regions.

Mayor of Kharkiv (2006-2010) 
From March 2006 to March 2010, Dobkin was Mayor of Kharkiv. In office, Dobkin was close to Hennadiy Kernes, who exerted unofficial power upon Dobkin. In 2007, a leaked video of Kernes vulgarly instructing Dobkin became famous in Ukraine, and led to the creation of several internet memes as a result.

Governor of Kharkiv Oblast (2010-2014) 
In March 2010, President Viktor Yanukovych appointed Dobkin as Governor of Kharkiv Oblast.

In 2014, amidst Euromaidan, Dobkin formed the Ukrainian Front, an organisation in support of Yanukovych. Dobkin furthermore stated his intention to "clean and purify our Ukrainian land of those who come here with plans for occupation." In February 2014, Dobkin called for Ukraine’s capital to be moved from Kyiv to Kharkiv, and for a federal structure of government to be established in Ukraine. He also claimed that by late February 2014, "all peaceful protesters of Euromaidan had left" and that "Negotiations with [remaining protesters] will be to no avail. They need to disarm, and those who resist and kill people physically destroyed".

Revolution of Dignity and 2014 pro-Russian unrest 
Following the Revolution of Dignity, Dobkin was a leading participant of local officials in Eastern Ukraine, which questioned the legality of the new government's actions and declared local officials would take responsibility for their own oblasts until order was restored. Dobkin was later reported to have fled to Russia, along with Kharkiv mayor Hennadiy Kernes, but he returned to attend a pro-Russian rally in the city.

In late February 2014, he indicated that he intended to run for president in the upcoming Ukrainian presidential election due to his concerns regarding the behaviour of the revolutionary government towards the Russophone population. Dobkin tendered his resignation as governor on 26 February 2014, "following [a] decision to run for the office of the President of Ukraine". On 2 March 2014, a decree by acting President Oleksandr Turchynov formally dismissed Dobkin as governor.
On 10 March 2014, Dobkin was arrested on charges of leading a separatist movement. However, on 20 August 2014, Dobkin's criminal case was closed "in the absence of corpus delicti".

2014 presidential campaign 
On 25 March 2014, Dobkin filed documents to the Central Election Commission to run in the 2014 Ukrainian presidential election. On 29 March, a Party of Regions convention supported Dobkin's nomination as a presidential candidate.

During his presidential campaign, Dobkin advocated for regionalism and the establishment of a federal Ukraine, Ukraine joining the Eurasian Customs Union, improving Russia–Ukraine relations, "defending the joint Russian-Ukrainian history, culture and traditions", maintaining Ukrainian neutrality, tax relief in the agricultural sector over the next 15 years, and the abolition of conscription.

In the presidential election, Dobkin received 3.03% of the vote, ranking 6th among all candidates, and performed well in eastern Ukraine, receiving 26.25% of the vote in Kharkiv Oblast and 8.02% of the vote in neighbouring Luhansk Oblast.

Return to parliamentary politics 
In the 2014 Ukrainian parliamentary election, Dobkin was again re-elected into the Verkhovna Rada, this time as third on the party list for Opposition Bloc.

On 13 July 2017, the Verkhovna Rada stripped Dobkin of his parliamentary immunity. Dobkin was subsequently arrested on suspicions of abuse of office and assistance to fraud in order to obtain 78 hectares of land in Kharkiv worth more than US$8.5 million. Two days later, a Kyiv court ruled that Dobkin was to remain in custody until 14 September 2017, and granted bail at ₴50 million. On 19 July, members of the Opposition Bloc posted his bail.

Dobkin left Opposition Bloc in October 2017, voicing his disapproval of the party's support for judicial reform efforts. In February 2018, he founded his own party, the Party of Christian Socialists, and in June 2019 joined Opposition Bloc — Party for Peace and Development, along with the rest of his party. In the 2019 Ukrainian parliamentary election, Dobkin unsuccessfully ran as a candidate on the party list, with the party failing to cross the 5% election barrier.

2020 and 2021 Kharkiv mayoral elections 
Although in July 2020 Dobkin had announced his candidacy for Mayor of Kharkiv in the 2020 Ukrainian local elections, he stated in September 2020 that he had submitted documents for registration as a candidate for mayor of Kharkiv. On 4 October 2020, 11 days prior to the election, he withdrew his candidacy in favour of incumbent mayor Hennadiy Kernes, his political ally and successor.

Kernes died on 17 December 2020 from complications of COVID-19. A snap mayoral election in Kharkiv was set on 31 October 2021 to determinate Kernes' successor. In this election, Dobkin was once again a mayoral candidate. On 29 September 2021, Opposition Platform — For Life announced it supported Dobkin in the mayoral election. The election commission declared Ihor Terekhov the winner of the election with 50.66% of the votes. Dobkin finished the race in second place with 28.4% of the vote.

2022 Russian invasion of Ukraine 
Dobkin condemned the 2022 Russian invasion of Ukraine on its second day. On 17 March 2022, Dobkin posted a video of President Volodymyr Zelenskyy on his Instagram page, and signed it with the comment "[He is] ours".

In June, Igor Girkin (Strelkov) said that a month before the start of the 2022 Russian invasion of Ukraine, the 5th service of the FSB was negotiating with Dobkin about the possibility of creating the so-called “Kharkov People’s Republic” in the Kharkiv region.

Personal life
Dobkin is married and has four children; a son and three daughters.

Since first meeting Hennadiy Kernes in 1998, Dobkin was his close friend and political ally, and was succeed by him as Mayor of Kharkiv in 2010. Kernes remained as mayor until his death in 2020.

Dobkin's younger brother, Dmytro Dobkin, was elected as a People's Deputy of Ukraine in the 2012 Ukrainian parliamentary election for the Party of Regions, being re-elected in 2014 as a member of Opposition Bloc. In the 2019 Ukrainian parliamentary election, Dmytro Dobkin failed to be re-elected.

Dobkin is widely known by the nickname "Dopa".

See also
 List of mayors of Kharkiv

Notes

References

1970 births
Living people
Politicians from Kharkiv
Ukrainian people of Jewish descent
Soviet Jews
Ukrainian Jews
Social Democratic Party of Ukraine (united) politicians
Party of Regions politicians
Fourth convocation members of the Verkhovna Rada
Fifth convocation members of the Verkhovna Rada
Governors of Kharkiv Oblast
Mayors of Kharkiv
Pro-government people of the Euromaidan
Jewish Ukrainian politicians
Candidates in the 2014 Ukrainian presidential election
People of the 2014 pro-Russian unrest in Ukraine
Eighth convocation members of the Verkhovna Rada
Opposition Bloc politicians
Prisoners and detainees of Ukraine
Ukrainian prisoners and detainees
Heads of government who were later imprisoned
Recipients of the Honorary Diploma of the Cabinet of Ministers of Ukraine